Victor Pereyra-Zavala (born March 5, 1999) is an American soccer player.

Career 
Pereyra-Zavala played with Atlanta United FC academy whilst also appearing for Atlanta's United Soccer League affiliate Atlanta United 2 during their inaugural season in 2018.

Pereyra-Zavala has committed to playing college soccer at Georgia State University from 2018 and beyond.

References

External links

1999 births
Living people
American soccer players
Association football midfielders
Atlanta United 2 players
Georgia State Panthers men's soccer players
USL Championship players
Soccer players from Georgia (U.S. state)
People from Norcross, Georgia